Sixten Isberg (February 8, 1921 – June 10, 2012) was a Swedish alpine skier who competed in the 1948 Winter Olympics and in the 1952 Winter Olympics. He was the Swedish slalom champion in 1941, 1945, and 1949.

He was born in Åre and competed for Åre SLK, a slalom club which has fostered many Swedish champions.

In 1948 he finished tenth in the alpine skiing slalom event and 30th in the downhill competition.

In 1952 he finished 30th in the giant slalom and 34th in the downhill competition.

References

External links
Alpine skiing 1948 
Sixten Isberg's profile at the Swedish Olympic Committee 

1921 births
2012 deaths
People from Åre Municipality
Swedish male alpine skiers
Olympic alpine skiers of Sweden
Alpine skiers at the 1948 Winter Olympics
Alpine skiers at the 1952 Winter Olympics
Sportspeople from Jämtland County